Mid-Missouri is a loosely-defined region comprising the central area of the U.S. state of Missouri.  The region's largest city is Columbia (population 121,717);  the Missouri state capital, Jefferson City, and the University of Missouri are also located here.  The region also includes portions of the Lake of the Ozarks, the Ozark Mountains, and the Missouri Rhineland. Mid-Missouri is centered on two contiguous metropolitan areas: the Columbia Metropolitan Area and the Jefferson City Metropolitan Area, which together have a population of over 400,000.

Definition
Counties that are usually considered to be in Mid-Missouri are Audrain, Boone, Callaway, Camden, Chariton, Cole, Cooper, Gasconade, Howard, Macon, Miller, Moniteau, Montgomery, Morgan, Osage, Pettis, Randolph, and Saline. Counties that are sometimes considered to be in the region are Adair, Benton, Laclede, Maries, Phelps, Pulaski, and Warren.

Municipalities

Cities over 100,000
Columbia, Missouri (largest city)

Cities over 40,000
Jefferson City, Missouri (Missouri's capital city)

Cities over 20,000
Sedalia, Missouri
Rolla, Missouri

Cities over 10,000
Kirksville, Missouri
Lebanon, Missouri
Fort Leonard Wood, Missouri
Moberly, Missouri
Marshall, Missouri
Fulton, Missouri
Mexico, Missouri

Cities over 1,000
Boonville, Missouri
Warrenton, Missouri
Macon, Missouri
Waynesville, Missouri
Eldon, Missouri
Osage Beach, Missouri
St. Robert, Missouri
California, Missouri
St. James, Missouri
Centralia, Missouri
Vandalia, Missouri
Camdenton, Missouri
Ashland, Missouri
Tipton, Missouri
Holts Summit, Missouri
Wright City, Missouri
Montgomery City, Missouri
Fayette, Missouri
Owensville, Missouri
Versailles, Missouri
Hermann, Missouri
Warsaw, Missouri
Slater, Missouri
Salisbury, Missouri
Lake Ozark, Missouri
Huntsville, Missouri
Belle, Missouri
Dixon, Missouri
Wardsville, Missouri
Hallsville, Missouri
Linn, Missouri
Sweet Springs, Missouri
La Plata, Missouri
Wellsville, Missouri
Lincoln, Missouri
La Monte, Missouri
St. Martins, Missouri
Marthasville, Missouri
Cole Camp, Missouri
Glasgow, Missouri
Stover, Missouri

Media

Television
 KMOS (6.1 PBS, 6.2 Create, 6.3 World, 6.4 PBS Kids)
 KOMU (8.1 NBC, 8.3 The CW)
 KRCG  (13.1 CBS, 13.2 Comet TV, 13.3 Charge!, 13.4 TBD)
 KMIZ (17.1 ABC, 17.2 Me-TV, 17.3 MyNetworkTV, 17.4 Fox)
 KQFX-LD (22.1 Fox, 22.2 Laff, 22.3 Grit, 22.4 Ion Mystery, 22.5 Dabl)
 KFDR (25.1 CTN, 25.2 CTNi, 25.3 CTN, 25.4 CTN Life)

Radio

FM
 KCOU (88.1)
 KHJR (88.1)
 KJLU (88.9)
 KOPN (89.5)
 KMCV (89.9)
 KMUC (90.5)
 KBIA (91.3)
 KMFC (92.1)
 KLOZ (92.7)
 KWJK (93.1)
 KSSZ (93.9)
 KATI (94.3)
 American Family Radio (94.7)
 KWWR (95.7)
 KCMQ (96.7)
 K246CA (97.1)
 KJMO (97.5)
 KPOW-FM (97.7)
 KOTC-LP (98.7)
 KCLR-FM (99.3)
 KBBM (100.1)
 KTGR-FM (100.5)
 K266CA (101.1)
 KPLA (101.5)
 KZWV (101.9)
 KBXR (102.3)
 KZJF (104.1)
 KRES (104.7)
 The Good News Voice (104.9)
 KZZT (105.5)
 KOQL (106.1)
 K293AX (106.5)
 KTXY (106.9)

AM
 KFAL (900)
 KWOS (950)
 KLIK (1240)
 KXEO (1340)
 KWRT (1370)
 KFRU (1400)
 KTGR (1580)

Transportation
Interstate Highways 70 (concurrent with U.S. 40) and 44 both pass through the region and intersect with each other in St. Louis. Columbia Regional Airport (COU) is the only commercial airport in Mid-Missouri and is served by American Eagle with non-stop service to either Dallas/Fort Worth Chicago-O'Hare or Denver International as well as providing general aviation services.

Highways

Interstate Highways
 Interstate 70
 Interstate 44

U.S. Highways
 U.S. Route 24
 U.S. Route 36
 U.S. Route 40 (mostly concurrent with I-70)
 U.S. Route 50 
 U.S. Route 54
 U.S. Route 63
 U.S. Route 65

References

Regions of Missouri